The 2019–20 División de Honor Juvenil de Fútbol season was the 34th since its establishment.

Competition format
The champion of each group and the best runner-up would have played in the 2020 Copa de Campeones and the Copa del Rey.
The other six runners-up and the two best third-placed teams would have played for the Copa del Rey.
In each group, at least four teams (thirteenth placed on down) would have been relegated to Liga Nacional.
The champion of the Copa de Campeones would get a place for the 2020–21 UEFA Youth League.

Suspension and curtailment
In March 2020, all fixtures were suspended due to the COVID-19 pandemic in Spain. On 6 May 2020, the Royal Spanish Football Federation announced the premature end of the leagues, revoking all relegations, declaring each divisional leader as champion and cancelling the Copa del Rey Juvenil and the Copa de Campeones for the season.

League tables

Group 1
<onlyinclude>

Group 2
<onlyinclude>

Group 3
<onlyinclude>

Group 4
<onlyinclude>

Group 5
<onlyinclude>

Group 6
<onlyinclude>

Group 7
<onlyinclude>

References

External links
Royal Spanish Football Federation

División de Honor Juvenil de Fútbol seasons
Juvenil
División de Honor Juvenil de Fútbol